This is a complete list of United States senators during the 115th United States Congress listed by seniority, from January 3, 2017, to January 3, 2019. It is a historical listing and will contain people who have not served the entire two-year Congress on account of resignations, deaths, or expulsions.

In this Congress, Bill Cassidy is the most junior senior senator. Jeff Sessions was the most senior junior senator at the start of this Congress, but resigned on February 8, 2017, to become United States Attorney General. Maria Cantwell has remained the most senior junior senator since.

Order of service is based on the commencement of the senator's first term. Behind this is former service as a senator (only giving the senator seniority within his or her new incoming class), service as vice president, a House member, a cabinet secretary, or a governor of a state. The final factor is the population of the senator's state.

Terms of service

U.S. Senate seniority list

See also
 115th United States Congress
 List of members of the United States House of Representatives in the 115th Congress by seniority

Notes

External links

115
Senate Seniority